Stoloniferina is a suborder of bryozoans belonging to the order Ctenostomatida.

References 

Bryozoans